These museums can be relevant:
 Agder Natural History Museum and Botanical Garden - formerly named Kristiansand Museum (until 1990).
 Kristiansand Cannon Museum, Batteri Vara, a museum in a German fortress from the World War II.
 Sørlandets Art Museum, in the town centre of Kristiansand.
 Vest-Agder Museum Gimle, a former manor house, next door to the natural history museum & botanical garden above.
 Vest-Agder Museum Kristiansand, an open-air museum, often for simplicity called Kristiansand Museum.